The Belling-Lee connector (also type 9,52, but largely only in the context of its specification, IEC 61169, Part 2: Radio-frequency coaxial connector of type 9,52) is commonly used in Europe and Australia to connect coaxial cables with each other and with terrestrial VHF/UHF roof antennas, antenna signal amplifiers, CATV distribution equipment, TV sets, and FM and DAB radio receivers. In these countries, it is known colloquially as a PAL antenna connector, IEC antenna connector, or simply as a TV aerial plug. It is one of the oldest coaxial connectors still commonly used in consumer devices. For television signals, the convention is that the source has a male connector and the receptor has a female connector. For FM radio signals, the convention is that the source has a female connector and the receptor has a male connector. This is more or less universally adopted with TV signals, while it's not uncommon for FM radio receivers to deviate from this, especially FM radio receivers from companies not based in the areas that use this kind of connector.

It was invented at Belling & Lee Ltd in Enfield, United Kingdom around 1922 at the time of the first BBC broadcasts. Originally intended for use only at MF frequencies (up to 1.6 MHz) when adopted for Television they were used for frequencies as high as 957 MHz.  Belling Lee Limited still exists as a wholly owned subsidiary of Dialight, since 1992.

In type 9,52, the 9,52, in French SI style, refers to the 9.525mm (or 0.375in) male external and female internal connector body diameter.

In their most common form the connectors just slide together. There is, however, also a screw-coupled variant which is specified to have an M14×1 thread.

There is also a miniature Belling-Lee connector which was used for internal connections inside some equipment (including BBC RC5/3 Band II receiver and the STC AF101 Radio Telephone).

See also 
 List of RF connector types
 F connector
 RF connector

References

External links 
 How to wire a Belling-Lee connector (TV aerial plug).
 Make your own fly-lead.

RF connectors
Television technology
Television terminology
Socket